The 2011 FIM Polska Grupa Energetyczna Speedway World Cup Final was the fourth and final race of the 2011 Speedway World Cup season. It was run on July 16 and was won by host nation Poland from Australia, Sweden and Denmark. The Final took place at the Edward Jancarz Stadium in Gorzów Wielkopolski.

Poland were led to victory but their captain, 2010 World Champion Tomasz Gollob who scored 17 of a possible 18 points from his 6 rides to be the top point scorer in the final. Gollob was well supported by team mates Jaroslaw Hampel (11pts), Krzysztof Kasprzak (8pts), Piotr Protasiewicz (8pts) and Janusz Kołodziej (7pts).

Results

See also
 2011 Speedway World Cup
 Motorcycle speedway

References 

!